Ja is a genus of beetles in the family Carabidae, containing the following species:

 Ja ana Ueno, 1955
 Ja toshioi Habu, 1981

References

Platyninae
Carabidae genera